NK Opatija is a Croatian association football club founded in 1911 and based in Opatija. It is one of the oldest football clubs in Croatia. They compete in Druga HNL, the second tier of the Croatian football league system.

History
The beginnings of organized football in Opatija date back to 1911, when the Opatija's branch of Croatian Sokol's football section was founded, under the name of "football department of the Croatian Sokol Opatija - Volosko". The initiative came from a group of students from the Trade Academy in Vienna, similarly to Split's "Hajduk" foundation by students in Prague in the same year.

The first official match played by Opatija was on May 14, 1911, in Sušak, competing with the football section of that town's Sokol. In 1912 the Germans of Opatija founded their own team - the German football club Opatija Vorwärts. The rivalry that immediately developed between the two clubs resulted in disagreements within the Croatian Sokol, so at the suggestion of Ivan Matetić Ronjgov, later a famous composer, a separate sports club was founded from it, with the name Slavenski Športski klub Opatija (Slavic sport club "Opatija").

The club changes its name again in 1919 to Hajduk and back to Športski klub Opatija in 1921, the city being now part of the Kingdom of Italy and its authorities pushing for the dropping of the "Slavic" prefix. In 1923 the club changes its name once more to Olymp, and then most players access the already existing local club of Concordia, while with new pressures by the  Italian authorities Olymp is renamed into Virtus. It was not until 1936 that the government's intention to name the club with the Italian name Abbazia would be fulfilled.

After World War II and the annexation of the town by communist Jugoslavia, in 1946 the new regime forces the club to become an all-round sports club like all clubs in the country, on a model copied by stalinist USSR. The lack of a playground made official performances impossible until October 31, 1948. when they play the first official match within the competition and group IV Rijeka. Since then, NK Opatija has played in the regional league, which has taken various forms and names, with more or less success.

In the 1950s and in the first half of the 1960s, Opatija competed in the sub-federal Jugoslav league. From 1965 it competed in the zonska liga, which after the reorganization of the competition in the 1980s became the regional league Rijeka-Pula. They won a place in the national Republican League in 1984 until 1990.

After  the Croatian independence and since 1992, the club started competing in the III. HNL. Opatija played in the Croatian second division in the 96/97 and 97/98 seasons, when the system was different from today. In 2002 it took part in the qualifications for the current II. HNL league but didn't qualify.

Opatija won the 2013–14 Treća HNL West group, but instead of promotion to the second division, they decided to play in the fourth division the next season due to not meeting the licensing requirements.

It finally joined Druga HNL in 2020/21 and is playing in the league since.

The club has been playing the second division games at Kantrida stadium in Rijeka but is looking into reconstructing their own stadium to allow them to play in Opatija the 2. HNL. Currently, the stadium's pitch dimensions are only 100x64 meters, which do not meet the requirements for the second division. However, the newly proposed stadium would only have dimensions of 90x60 meters, only good enough for the fifth division. The new stadium is currently planned to be built in 2021.

Recent seasons 

Key
 League: P = Matches played; W = Matches won; D = Matches drawn; L = Matches lost; F = Goals for; A = Goals against; Pts = Points won; Pos = Final position.
 Cup: PR = Preliminary round; R1 = First round; R2 = Round of 16; QF = Quarter-final; SF = Semi-final; RU = Runner-up; W = Competition won.

Honours
Croatian Third Football League – Division West (3): 2001–02, 2013–14, 2019–20
Croatian Fourth Football League – Division West (1): 2009–10

Current squad

References

External links

Association football clubs established in 1911
Football clubs in Croatia
Football clubs in Primorje-Gorski Kotar County
1911 establishments in Croatia